Gladesville is an unincorporated community in Jasper County, in the U.S. state of Georgia.

History
A post office called Gladesville was established in 1853, and remained in operation until 1931. The community was named for a glade near the original town site. An old variant name is "The Glades".

References

Unincorporated communities in Jasper County, Georgia